Saturnino "Satur" Cunanan Ocampo (born April 7, 1939) is a Filipino politician, activist, journalist, and writer.

As party president and first nominee, he led the party-list group Bayan Muna in three successful elections in 2001, 2004, and 2007. He was a member of the House of Representatives, and Deputy Minority Leader in the 14th Congress of the Philippines. He has done work in human rights and other areas.

After his three terms as representative, he ran for senator in the May 2010 elections; then-Representative Liza Maza of the women's partylist group GABRIELA and Ocampo were fielded by the Makabayan coalition and were included as guest senatorial candidates of the Nacionalista Party, a mainstream Philippine political party whose presidential standard bearer, Senator Manny Villar, they supported.

After the elections, on August 21, 2010, Ocampo started a weekly opinion column in the Philippine Star titled "At Ground Level".

Activism

Ocampo was a business editor of the pre-martial law Manila Times and was the founder of the Business and Economic Reporters Association of the Philippines. He is a lifetime member of the National Press Club.

President Ferdinand Marcos declared martial law on September 23, 1972, and Ocampo, among others, went underground. In 1973, Ocampo co-founded of the National Democratic Front (NDF), seeking to unite various anti-dictatorship forces.

In 1976, he was arrested and incarcerated as a political prisoner. For the next nine years he was severely tortured in various prison camps. At one point, he shared a cell with detained Philippine Collegian editor-in-chief Abraham Sarmiento, Jr. Though tried by a military court for rebellion, he was never found guilty. In 1985, while on pass to vote at the National Press Club annual elections, he escaped from the soldiers guarding him and rejoined the underground revolutionary movement. At the time of his escape, Ocampo was the longest-held political prisoner in the country.

After the dictatorship fell in 1986, President Corazon Aquino called for peace talks with the communists. Ocampo headed the peace negotiating panel of the NDF, which represents the Communist Party of the Philippines and the New People's Army. When the talks collapsed due to the killing of 18 farmers at a rally near the Malacañan Palace on January 22, 1987, Ocampo returned to the underground.

In 1989, he was rearrested together with his wife, Carolina Malay. Three years later in 1992, a year after his wife was released, he was freed. Neither was found guilty of any crime.

On November 28, 2018, Ocampo, Alliance of Concerned Teachers Rep. France Castro and over 70 others were arrested on allegations of kidnapping and human trafficking charges over the transport of Lumad minors from the town of Talaingod, Davao Del Norte. Ocampo's group was released after posting bail of PHP80,000.00 each.

References

External links

 Satur Ocampo official profile from the House of Representatives of the Philippines
 Satur Ocampo official profile from the Bayan Muna website
 Bayan Muna - official website
 

Filipino journalists
Filipino activists
Filipino Roman Catholics
Kapampangan people
People from Pampanga
Business and financial journalists
1939 births
Living people
Nacionalista Party politicians
Members of the House of Representatives of the Philippines for Bayan Muna
Polytechnic University of the Philippines alumni
The Philippine Star people
Torture_victims
Marcos martial law victims